Pyruvate dehydrogenase (quinone) (pyruvate dehydrogenase, pyruvic dehydrogenase, pyruvic (cytochrome b1) dehydrogenase, pyruvate:ubiquinone-8-oxidoreductase, pyruvate oxidase (ambiguous)) is an enzyme with systematic name pyruvate:ubiquinone oxidoreductase. This enzyme catalyses the following chemical reaction

 pyruvate + ubiquinone + H2O  acetate + CO2 + ubiquinol

This bacterial enzyme is located on the inner surface of the cytoplasmic membrane.

References

External links 
 

EC 1.2.5